Mount Silay is a stratovolcano and potentially active volcano located in Negros Island, in the Visayas area of the central Philippines. It is located inside the Northern Negros Natural Park. You can go there by the Silay−Lantawan Road,The Airport Road and Brgy E. Lopez.

See also
 List of potentially active volcanoes in the Philippines
 Philippine Institute of Volcanology and Seismology
 List of active volcanoes in the Philippines
 List of inactive volcanoes in the Philippines
 Mount Mandalagan
 Northern Negros Natural Park

References
 

Volcanoes of Negros Island
Potentially active volcanoes of the Philippines
Stratovolcanoes of the Philippines
Landforms of Negros Occidental
Silay